Teresa Lagergård (Lenartowicz) was born 1946 in Sosnowiec, Poland. She is professor emerita at University of Gothenburg, Sahlgrenska Academy, 
Institute of Biomedicine, Department of Microbiology and Immunology.

Education 
Lagergård holds an MA from University of Warsaw, Department of Biology and Ph.D. from Goteborg University, with thesis “Antibodies to Haemophilus influenzae and their bactericidal activity” (Ph.D. in Microbiology). She was 1988-1989 a post-doc at the National Institutes of Health (NIH), National Institutes of Childhood and Development (NICHD) in Bethesda, USA.

Research 
Lagergård continued research collaboration for many years with researchers from the NIH and USA. She also was involved in research studies and collaborated with scientists from Poland, Tanzania, South Africa and Kina.

Her main field of research include investigation of bacterial virulence factors, mechanisms of infection, infections immunology, vaccines and vaccine development. Main focus was on such bacteria as Haemophilus influenzae, H. ducreyi, and Streptococcus sp. Bordetella pertussis 1. She was a full professor of biomedicine at Mucosal Immunology and Vaccine Center in Gothenburg.

Lagergård is an author of more than 100 scientific publications, including chapter is scientific books within field of microbiology, infection, immunology and vaccine.

Lagergård is also an author of two books about her polish family: Postcards from grandfather Józef and Women in my family. She is a member of the Royal Society of Art and Sciences in Gothenburg (KVVS).

References

Living people
Academic staff of the University of Gothenburg
University of Warsaw alumni
University of Gothenburg alumni
Polish microbiologists
Women microbiologists
Year of birth missing (living people)